The Journal of Forensic Sciences (JFS) is a bimonthly peer-reviewed scientific journal is the official publication of the American Academy of Forensic Sciences, published by Wiley-Blackwell. It covers all aspects of forensic science. The mission of the JFS is to advance forensic science research, education and practice by publishing peer-reviewed manuscripts of the highest quality. These publications will strengthen the scientific foundation of forensic science in legal and regulatory communities around the world.

Abstracting and indexing
The journal is abstracted and indexed in:

According to the Journal Citation Reports, the journal has a 2020 impact factor of 1.832.

References

External links

English-language journals
Forensic science journals
Publications established in 2006
Wiley (publisher) academic journals
Bimonthly journals
Academic journals associated with learned and professional societies of the United States